A shopping caddy or shopping trolley is a large bag on wheels, used for carrying a large amount of shopping home on foot. The bag is typically made from a waterproof fabric, and wicker basket designs are also sold. The trolleys commonly have two parallel wheels on a hand truck style frame (with a handle and stand), but some designs have four or six wheels. Designs have recently been sold by fashion retailers Zara and Chanel.

In some countries the trolleys are traditionally regarded as being used by pensioner-age women, with granny cart being an American slang term for the four-wheeled wire-framed trolleys, which are sometimes used without a bag. In the UK they are known as a granny trolley and are available in foldable versions.
In 2023, the Farino Carrier with rollerblade wheels was pitched as a unique new product on Dragons' Den.

See also
Dicycle
Reusable shopping bag
Shopping bag
Sustainable packaging
Two wheeler

References

Carts
Shopping bags
Reuse